The Russian-Serbian Humanitarian Center (abbr. RSHC) is an intergovernmental nonprofit organization with the headquarters in Niš, Serbia. It is located near the Niš Constantine the Great Airport.

The Center is operating in Serbia and neighboring countries. It is an affiliated member of the International Civil Defence Organization (ICDO).

The Center is designed for fast regaining in case of fire, natural disasters and technological disasters. It is also in charge of the removal of residual explosive devices from the NATO bombing of Yugoslavia. Apart from these tasks, it also provides humanitarian aid to people affected by emergencies and training and skills development activities in the field of prevention and elimination of emergency situations.

History

Formation
The Russian-Serbian Humanitarian Center was established on 25 April 2012, following the signing of the Cooperation Agreement between the Government of the Russian Federation and the Government of the Republic of Serbia, on the initiative by Sergey Shoygu. The signatories of the Agreement are: Ivica Dačić, at the time Deputy Prime Minister of Serbia and the Minister of Internal Affairs of Serbia, Vladimir Puchkov, at the time Deputy Minister of Emergency Situations of Russia.

On 25 April 2013, Dačić and Puchkov signed further conclusions about the area of activities that Center provides, with the expectations that the Center should begin to work in full capacity until the end of 2013.

2016–17 Western pressure
In 2017, Russian officials launched an initiative that the Center gets a diplomatic status, and its employees, but it came to disapproval by the Western countries. Dačić, Deputy Prime Minister of Serbia, stated that the initiative is being politicized.

In June 2017, Maria Zakharova, Director of the Information and Press Department of the Ministry of Foreign Affairs of Russia called these "spying allegations" an absurd. Hoyt Brian Yee, U.S. Deputy Assistant Secretary for European and Eurasian Affairs responded that Center in this form is not a threat, but what it may become would be a serious issue.

Director of the Center explained that with diplomatic status, the Center would have tax relief for payment of equipment and all other expenses.

The United States Ambassador to Serbia Kyle Randolph Scott strongly opposed this idea, saying that: "if diplomatic passports are given to the employees of the Center, inspection of their activities would not be possible". Thus way, he suggested that Russians would gain military presence in Serbia.

In August 2017, in his visit to Serbia, U.S. Senator Ron Johnson urged Serbian Government not to give diplomatic status to the Center, as it may "impact Serbian economy and Western direct investments" in the future.

References

External links
 

VK account

Telegram channel

Visual tour 

2012 establishments in Serbia
Buildings and structures in Niš
Disaster preparedness
Humanitarian aid organizations
Russia–Serbia relations
Non-profit organizations based in Serbia